Feral children, children who have lived from a young age without human contact, appear in mythological and fictional works, usually as human characters who have been raised by animals. Often their dual heritage is a benefit to them, protecting them from the corrupting influence of human society (Tarzan), or permitting the development and expression of their own animal nature (Enkidu), or providing access to the wisdom and lore by which animals survive in the wild (Mowgli).

In most tales, the child is lost (Tarzan) or abandoned (Romulus and Remus) before being found and adopted in a chance encounter with a sympathetic wild animal. In some stories, the child chooses to abandon human society (Where the Wild Things Are) or refuses to enter society altogether (Peter Pan). The child usually returns to civilization, but may decide to return again to life in the wild (Tarzan). In some cases, they find themselves trapped between worlds unable to enter entirely into either human society or animal society (Mowgli).

In mythology and ancient literature
 Enkidu, raised by unspecified beasts, becomes the friend of the hero Gilgamesh. (see also Epic of Gilgamesh)
 Iranian šāhnāmeh "The Book of Kings / The king of books", introduces Zaal, the mythical hero of Iran, raised by Simurgh, a very large and wise bird which darkens the sky when flying, said to be related to the phoenix.
 In Ibn Tufail's Hayy ibn Yaqdhan, Hayy is raised by a gazelle on a desert island and becomes an autodidactic philosopher.
 In Ibn al-Nafis' Theologus Autodidactus, Kamil is also raised by animals on a deserted island, and becomes an autodidactic scientist and theologian.
 According to American folklore, Pecos Bill was raised by coyotes.
 In Greek mythology, Atalanta was raised by a she bear after her father abandoned her in a forest until the day she was found by kindly hunters.
 In Mongolian Oirat mythology, the hero Jangar is taught to roar by a tiger, taught to hunt by an eagle, taught to run by antelope, suckled by she-wolves, and fed fruit by deer.

In modern prose
 In 1879, Albert Robida created The Adventures of Saturnin Farandoul. Saturnin Farandoul a child raised by orangutans who becomes king of the apes.
 H. Rider Haggard's 1889 novelette, "Allan's Wife," features the antagonist Hendrika, a white Boer child who was stolen and raised by baboons. She is later rescued and "civilized" by an English family, but she retains baboon-like behavior and the ability to communicate with baboons.
 An early modern example of a feral child comes from Rudyard Kipling's 1894 short story collection The Jungle Book. His protagonist Mowgli is raised by wolves and becomes the ruler of the jungle. 
 Peter Pan, created by J. M. Barrie in 1902, is a boy who fled to the magical Neverland and refused to grow up.
 The Blue Lagoon, created by H. de Vere Stacpoole in (1908) tells the story of two English children, a boy and a girl, stranded on a deserted tropical island in the Polynesia.
 Tarzan, of Edgar Rice Burroughs’ Tarzan of the Apes (1912), has become an iconic hero of novels, comic strips, and motion pictures.
 The German trilogy Die Höhlenkinder (1918-1920) by Alois Theodor Sonnleitner is about two children who grow up in a hidden area cut off from the outside world without adults, after they had to flee from the Thirty Years' War. Later they have a son who finds his way back.
 Shasta of the Wolves (1919) by Olaf Baker, in which a Native American boy is raised by a wolf pack in the Pacific Northwest.
 The Garden of God (1923), a sequel of The Blue Lagoon which features a new British child couple, descendants of the British child couple from the previous book generated by incest who live a new adventure on the same Polynesian island.
 Jungle Born (1924) by John Eyton, in which a boy raised by rhesus macaques in northern India inadvertently saves a teenage girl from her abusive father.
 The House Without Windows & Eepersip's Life There (1927) by Barbara Newhall Follett, in which Eepersip, runs away from home to live in idyllic Nature (successively, a meadow, the sea, and, finally, the mountains). 
 Bijeli jelen / "White Deer" (1947) by Vladimir Nazor, in which a six-year-old girl named Anka was lost in the forest while herding a flock of geese. She is adopted by deer and soon befriends most of animals in the forest. Her main antagonist is a wolf, while her closest ally is a white deer. After growing up she becomes a powerful forest-warrior who helps both animals and humans living in the forest. 
 In Howard Fast's 1960 short story "The First Men", a tale of a wolf-child starts off the series of letters.
 In Robert A. Heinlein's 1961 novel Stranger in a Strange Land, Valentine Michael Smith is a human raised by Martians on Mars, as he returns to Earth in early adulthood. The novel explores his interaction with — and eventual transformation of — human culture.
 In Boris and Arkady Strugatsky's 1971 novel The Little One (also known as Space Mowgly), a human from Earth, Piere Semyonov, has been raised by an alien non-humanoid civilization after his parents' spaceship crashed onto an uncharted planet. After his discovery by the Terran scientists, several attempts to integrate him back to human society were undertaken, but all were in vain.
 The theme of young adolescent runaways seeking shelter with wild animals and learning their ways is seen in novels such as the Newbery Medal-winning novel Julie of the Wolves by Jean Craighead George (1972).
 Philip Jose Farmer's anthology Mother Was A Lovely Beast: A Feral Man Anthology, Fiction And Fact About Humans Raised By Animals (1974) collects several stories of fictional feral children.
 Jane Yolen's Passager (1996), the first of the Young Merlin trilogy of short novels, depicts a slightly more realistic view of such childhood. Abandoned in a Welsh forest at the age of seven years, the boy who will become Merlin lives in the forest for a year nearly as well as its natives, until a falconer who is used to domesticating animals captures him and begins the long and difficult task of educating him in human behavior.
 In Karen Hesse's The Music of Dolphins (1996), a young girl called Mila is found after having been raised by dolphins for over a decade. In the book, Mila is taken to a clinic with other undomesticated human young, none of whom adapt to mainstream humanity as easily as she does. At the end of the book, Mila returns to the dolphin pod, showing her rejection of human society.
 In the "Firekeeper Saga" starting with Through Wolf's Eyes (2001) by author Jane Lindskold, the family of a young girl named Firekeeper and her colony are killed by a fire, and she is the only survivor. She is then taken in by the "Royal Wolves" who speak their own language with gestures and signals. Because Firekeeper had already learned a human language before going to live with the wolves, she was able to return to human society and became a valuable asset to the royalty, but she found that humans were not as noble as the wolves she loved as family. Firekeeper is always barefoot and tends to throw fits whenever she is told to wear shoes. It is her greatest wish to become a wolf herself and leave the humans behind again.
 Wild Angel (2001) by Pat Murphy tells the story of a young girl raised by wolves from the age of four in gold-rush-era California.
 World War Z by Max Brooks contain many references to feral children - in this case, children who were separated from normal humanity at some point during the zombie war, and were forced to live in the wild, contending not just with the problems of survival but also the hazard posed by the walking dead. The novel suggests they formed a kind of rudimentary social or "pack" structure with basic tool-using abilities, and in most cases were capable of being slowly rehabilitated.
 In the 2006 book Dogboy by Victor Kelleher, a young boy is abandoned at birth by his mother and is raised by a half domestic dog in a litter of puppies. He is later brought back to a nearby human settlement by the dog, searching for a home with her owner once again, and her only surviving pup but is rejected as an abomination.
 Camilla Way's 2008 novel Little Bird concerns a girl kidnapped as a toddler by a mute and held captive until the age of twelve.
 In 2009 Eva Hornung's novel Dogboy, set in Moscow, tells the story of two feral children who live with a pack of dogs. One of the children was abandoned at the age of 4 and the other is brought to the lair, as a baby, by the dominant female in the pack. The children eventually come under the notice of two scientists working in a centre that rehabilitates abandoned children.
 The Dictator's Moustaches, a 2009 Italian novel by Anna Russo concerns an abandoned baby rescued and brought up by dogs.
 Magic Hour by Kristin Hannah concerns a young girl who appears out of the forest, with no information as to her origins. She is called 'wolf girl'; she is cared for and eventually loved by fallen psychologist Julia.
 In Victor Robert Lee's 2013 novel  Performance Anomalies, protagonist Cono 7Q becomes an orphan as a young boy in northeast Brazil, surviving alone in the forest by hunting small animals.
 In the Steven Bauer book Satyrday, Derin was raised by a satyr named Matthew, after an evil great horned owl killed his family and destroyed his clan..

In comics
 "The Wild Wonders" in the 1970s British comic book series Valiant are two boys lost on a Scottish island and raised in a normal environment, developing their own language. Returned to human civilization at about a decade old, they become superb athletes and enjoy many comic adventures.
 In "Fishboy", written by Scott Goodall, (1968 - 1975 in Buster), the hero of the title was abandoned on a remote island as a baby, implausibly learned how to breathe underwater and to communicate with aquatic fauna, and grew webbed fingers and toes.
 Goodall also created "Kid Chameleon" (1970–1972) in Cor!! Raised by reptiles in the Kalahari Desert after the murder of his parents, Kid Chameleon wears a suit of lizard scales that can change color to camouflage him like his namesake the chameleon.
 The French comic book (bande dessinée) Pyrénée (1998), by Regis Loisel and Philippe Sternis, features a girl who is raised by a bear and taught wisdom by a blind old eagle in the French Pyrenees, the bear having named her after the mountains without the "s". This story has won critical acclaim and has been translated into German and Dutch, but has also drawn some criticism over the girl's nudity.
 Little Dee is a webcomic where a prevocal human who was lost in a forest is adopted by a bear, dog, and vulture. The strip contains purely fantastic elements (the characters live in a cave but occasionally fly planes or cook food) and focuses more on the natives and their issues of handling a human.
 In DC Comics' Elseworlds story Superman: The Feral Man of Steel (1994), Kal-El (Clark Kent) is raised by wolves in 19th century India, in an homage to The Jungle Book, until he is discovered by an expedition led by Lex Luthor and Lois Lane and brought back to Britain.
 In the Marvel Comics universe, a Tarzan-inspired character Ka-Zar is raised by a sabertooth tiger named Zabu in the Savage Land, a vast tropical jungle hidden from the world in the depths of Antarctica. He goes on to have many adventures including features in the popular X-Men series where he also has some encounters with Spider-Man.
 The Quality Comics hero Black Condor, was a boy raised in Mongolia by highly intelligent condors, gains the improbable power of flight and later becomes a superhero. Secret Origins #21 revealed that Condor's flight ability was due to a radioactive meteorite near the condors' nest.
 Holyoke Publishing's hero Cat-Man was orphaned at a young age and raised by Burmese tigers. He adapted to life in the wild by developing super-strength, enhanced vision, and other talents which served him well when he returned to the US and became a superhero.
 The Hexagon Comics hero Zembla was a boy raised by lions.
 Cassandra Cain, the fourth Batgirl, was raised by her father David Cain to be the perfect assassin, taught to read body language instead of learning human speech and isolated from anyone who might talk to her until she was eight years old. In her initial appearances she was unable to speak, capable of picking up combat skills easily and predicting opponents' moves in a fight simply from the way they stood but unable to understand spoken language, but has since been shown to have learned how to speak and think in English with help from a psychic 'rewiring' her brain to accept language.
 Trolls de Troy features a human girl named Waha, who was accidentally raised by Trolls from infancy.
 In the Japanese manga Demon Slayer: Kimetsu no Yaiba, Inosuke Hashibara was raised by wild boars, wearing the hide of his boar mother after her death.

In film
These films have fiction and one is based on the true story:

 The 1965 film Mara of the Wilderness featuring Mara Wade (played by Lori Saunders) who was raised by wolves in the Alaskan wilderness (ever since her parents were killed in a bear attack) where she lives barefoot and only wearing a fur dress. Mara later befriends an anthropologist named Ken Williams (played by Adam West) who is interested in teaching her what is in the world. Ken also discovers that she is hunted by a ruthless carnival worker named Jarnagan (played by Theo Marcuse).
 L'Enfant Sauvage, a 1970 French film directed by François Truffaut, is based on the true story of a nude feral boy (played by Jean-Pierre Cargol) discovered living in the forests of 18th century France. A doctor (played by François Truffaut) who is a deaf specialist tries to socialize the boy who cannot speak. Based on the account of Dr. Jean Marc Gaspard Itard.
 The Blue Lagoon, a 1980 film directed by Randal Kleiser, two cousins Emmeline and Richard Lestrange left since Paddy died after a drunken bringe.
 The 1982 Italian comedy Bingo Bongo features a man who grew up among chimpanzees in the African jungle after escaping a plane crash as a baby.
 In the Kennedy–Miller film Mad Max 2, a character called the "Feral Kid" lives in the wasteland near the refinery settlement. He flips, growls when displeased and has a fascination for the Gyro Captain's autogyro. The Feral Kid wears shorts and boots made from hide, hunts and defends himself using a lethal metal boomerang.
 On the Mexican "clone" of Tarzan called El Rey de Los Gorilas also known as El Simio Blanco (means The King of the Gorillas and also known as The White Ape), a baby survived in the canoe that drifted away from the "Black Forest", the territory of the fearsome cannibal tribe called "The Plant Men". The gorilla that found the baby tore off the baby's clothes and the baby boy was naked. The narrator named him Ape. He grew up in a green loincloth with back length hair as a 12-year-old child and later sported a beard, shoulder blade-length hair, and a different loincloth as a man. Ape rescued a woman named Eva from the Plant Men to the jungle and they fell in love. Some months later, they had a son.
 In the 1994 film, "The Secret of Roan Inish" Fiona's brother, Jamie was thought to be lost at sea as an infant but was raised by a seal-like creature called a selkie.
 In the Tarzan parody George of the Jungle, the main protagonist George (as depicted in the live-action film) was traveling in the airplane above Bukuvu (a fictional nation in Africa) and the plane crashed. None of the passengers died, but George was lost. He was raised by an ape named "APE" who could speak in human language and even read books and played violin. In one episode of the 2007 reboot of the series, he came here in a monsoon of orphans.
 Walk Like a Man is a 1987 comedy film starring Howie Mandel about a man who was raised by wild dogs.
 Bad Boy Bubby is a 1993 Australian film by director Rolf de Heer in which the title character is subjected to lifelong social isolation by his mother. Events in the film lead Bubby to venture into the world where many of his interactions take on a darkly comical aspect.
 Nell is a film in which a young woman (portrayed by Jodie Foster) is raised by her extremely androphobic mother in an isolated cabin, and has to face other human beings for the first time after her mother's death.
 In the Friday the 13th film series, the main character Jason Voorhees was presumed drowned when he was 11 years old, but survived the drowning and grew up living in the woods.
 In Batman Returns, the film's version of Penguin spent his childhood among penguins in Gotham City's sewers after being abandoned by his parents due to his deformity and vicious nature as an infant.
 In the Steven Spielberg film The Flintstones, Barney and Betty Rubble adopt a feral child named Bamm-Bamm, who was raised by wild mastodons.
 In Jumanji, the character Alan Parrish is lost in an alternate realm for 26 years due to the consequences of the eponymous board game where the clue read "In the Jungle You Must Wait Till the Dice Reads 5 or 8." After escaping, Alan (played by Robin Williams) seems relatively normal if a little bit eccentric and paranoid. The character Danny Budwing suffers a similar fate in Zathura.
 The title character of Hayao Miyazaki's 1997 anime film Princess Mononoke, called San, was raised by a wolf goddess along with her two wolf pups. San is drawn into a deadly conflict between the forest gods and the humans whose presence seems to threaten them.
 In Human Nature, a man (Toby Huss) experiences a psychological breakdown from the stresses of modern living as well as the Assassination of John F. Kennedy. He kidnaps his son to raise him in the woods. This boy (portrayed by Rhys Ifans) is eventually discovered by Dr. Nathan Bronfman (portrayed by Tim Robbins) and Lila Jute (portrayed by Patricia Arquette). Upon being named Puff, he is used by Dr. Bronfman as a living example of socialization's ability to "civilize" a wild human being.
 In The Adventures of Sharkboy and Lavagirl in 3-D, Sharkboy (portrayed by Taylor Lautner) is a young warrior who was raised by sharks after he was separated from his father, a marine biologist, when a waterspout sunk their floating laboratory. He has many shark-like adaptations to his body including gills, fins, sharpened teeth, claws (although they seem to only be attached to his gloves), peak strength, highly trained sense of hearing, strong sense of smell, agility, reflexes and swimming ability. Sharkboy can also communicate with marine life and is not affected by deep sea pressure.
 In the film Barbie as the Island Princess, six-year-old Ro was shipwrecked on an island and raised by a red panda, peacock, and an elephant. Ro has no memory of her past and ten years later a prince discovers the island and takes her back to his kingdom. She is later revealed to be a long-lost princess who was lost at sea.
 In the 2013 horror film Mama, young girls Victoria and Lilly are raised in the forest for 5 years by a spirit they call "Mama" after the spirit killed their depressed father before he could commit murder-suicide on them. As Victoria's glasses were taken from her, she mistook the spirit as the ghost of her mother. During that time, Victoria and Lily end up developing their own language, start acting like animals, and gain a filthy appearance while wearing what's left of their clothes. When they are discovered by trackers hired by their uncle and brought back to society, Victoria is able to reintegrate while Lily (whose only memories are of being raised in the forest and who sees the spirit as her true mother) is not.
 In the 2013 Disney film Frozen, a young boy Kristoff had been raised along with his reindeer pet, Sven, by Rock Trolls in a valley until he grew up and left them to start his career as an ice harvester.
 In the film Barefoot, the character Daisy Kensington (portrayed by Evan Rachel Wood) was raised in isolation all of her life and has been barefoot since childhood.
 In the film The Boxtrolls, the main character Eggs is raised by the title characters in their underground cavernous home following the kidnapping of his father when he was a baby.
 In the film The Good Dinosaur, a little feral caveboy named Spot befriends the main character Arlo the Apatosaurus who behaves like a dog.
 In the film Storks, a girl named Tulip (voiced by Katie Crown) is the only human among the storks at Cornerstore on Stork Mountain after her homing location beacon was accidentally destroyed and was kept on Stork Mountain until she turned 18 to be returned to the human world but instead helps a top delivery stork deliver an unauthorized baby.
 In the 2016 film Pete's Dragon, a boy named Pete survived a car accident that killed his parents and was chased by a pack of wolves into the woods, until he was saved by a dragon. The dragon, whom Pete named Elliot from his favorite book he still has, took him in and raised him in the woods for six years. Then Pete was found by a forest ranger named Grace Meacham (Bryce Dallas Howard) and brought him to a nearby town.
 In the Pokémon film "Pokémon the Movie: Secrets of the Jungle,"Ash and Pikachu discover a feral boy named Koko, Koko's real name is Al Molybden who was raised by the Mythical Pokémon called: Zarude in the Okoya Forest with the other Jungle Pokémon, originally Koko had parents who are researchers named: Chrom and Phossa Molybden, but Dr. Zed killed the couple by running them off a road leaving them wounded, Before Zed could reach them, Chrom and Phossa sent their son down a river inside a cradle to protect him along with their research contained in Phossa Molybden's pendant, Dr. Zed stole their sample supply of the healing spring water and left Chrom and Phossa Molybden to die in an explosion of their wrecked car. leading Al Molybden to found by Zarude, where Koko sported a loincloth, arm bands, and tribal paint on his face and torso resembling Zarude. Being raised by a Zarude caused Koko to think that he is a Pokémon, Koko is the ever first human to use a Pokémon move called: Jungle Healing.
 In the film Satyrday, Derin was raised by a satyr named Matthew, after an evil great horned owl killed his family and destroyed his clan, same with Vera, the duerotagonist, who was raised by a magical white arctic fox.
 In the film The Troll Story, Sun-Eye, the main protagonist, was raised by a troll woman named Troll-Mum, in Troll Forest.
 In the film Crusoe, six-year-old Nick was shipwrecked on an island and raised by a Bengal tiger, an Indian porcupine, a striped hyena, a rhesus macaque, and an Indian elephant. Nick has no memory of his past and twenty years later a young woman discovers the island and takes him back to her country. He is later revealed to be a long-lost son of a businessman who was lost at sea.
 In the French animated film, Le Jour Des Corneilles, Pierre, the boy, was raised by his father, who turned into an ogre-like creature due to being maddened by his wife's death of childbirth, and later brings him to a town to heal him and meets a girl named Malon. Though he is raised by his father, Pierre does have some feral childlike traits.
 In the 2021 film Raya and the Last Dragon, Noi was raised in the streets of Talon by the monkey-like Orginis after the Druun petrified her mother.
 In the 2022 film Disenchanted, Giselle was raised by animals of the forest as a baby in her backstory told by Pip the chipmunk.

In television
 In the Gilligan's Island episode "Gilligan Meets Jungle Boy," Gilligan encounters a boy (portrayed by a younger Kurt Russell) living in the jungles of the island wearing only a loincloth. Not much was known of the jungle boy's background before his encounter with Gilligan. The jungle boy can mimic words said by the main characters when they try to teach him human manners. Yet when he sees himself in a mirror by Mary-Ann, he screams and runs out of the hut. The jungle boy shows Gilligan a natural helium outlet in the jungle which means the Professor decides to make a balloon out of the castaways' raincoats glued together with tree sap. By the time the Professor finishes his balloon, the jungle boy is shown wearing civilian clothes. As it ends up, the jungle boy unknowingly takes off in the balloon and lands on a Navy carrier. The radio news states that he only knows the words "boy boy, girl girl, no no."
 The protagonist of the 1977–78 American television series Lucan was a young man who had been raised by wolves in Northern Minnesota and then captured/rescued by a research institute which spent ten years acclimatizing him to civilized society.
 In The Six Million Dollar Man episode "The Wolf Boy," there was a boy named Gary (portrayed by Buddy Foster) who was reported to be living with wolves on the Japanese island of Hoyoko. He is shown to have long blonde hair and only wearing what's left of his pants. Steve Austin believes the youth to be the son of a U.S. ambassador and his wife who were found dead in the wilderness. Steve and Kuroda were able to get Gary to remember his past while protecting him from some people that want him dead. After all that has happened, Gary is seen in some new clothes as Kuroda plans to re-educate him in the woods until some human behavior specialists from the United States can arrive to help him and re-introduce him to society.
 In Tales of the Gold Monkey episode "Ape Boy", a young man was raised by a fictional-species of monkey who mistook main-character Sarah to be his real-mother, though Sarah, Jake and Corky reunite him with a relative.
 In the second episode of the original Star Trek, "Charlie X", the Enterprise takes aboard the title character, a 17-year-old boy named Charlie, the sole survivor of a crash on a remote planet which occurred in his infancy. He claims to have survived and learned language via the ship's computer records, but in actuality was taken in by an advanced alien race, who taught him psychic abilities.
 Smurfs introduced a character called "Wild Smurf" who was stranded in the forest when a rainstorm caused the stork to lose the baby Smurf, whereupon he was raised by a family of squirrels. Wild Smurf can only speak in the squirrel's language is at home in the forest, but eventually learns to befriend and interact with his fellow Smurfs, who in turn appreciate his wilderness survival abilities in dangerous situations.
 The TV shows that involved Michael Berk and Douglas Schwartz had feral children as a plot for an episode of theirs shows:
 In the Manimal episode "Female of the Species", a boat accident on the Ganges River caused by Stanford Langly (portrayed by Michael McGuire) kills the parents of the four-year-old Sarah Evers, causing her to be raised by wolves and living in the Sultanpur district's forests naked, untamed, and acting less than human. When the long-haired wolf girl (portrayed by Laura Cushing) in an age somewhere between her late teens and early 20s is captured years later by a hunting party led by Professor Barta (portrayed by Rick Jason), she is the subject at his university and has been dressed in a jungle bikini since she rips whatever clothes they offer her. Stanford tries to orchestrate another attempt on her life which is thwarted by Jonathan Chase. Jonathan manages to protect her and gain her trust. Though Jonathan did have to get Sarah into getting acquainted with Tyrone (who thought Sarah was a part of Jonathan's own masquerade party). After Brooke gave Sarah Evers a bath, she tells Jonathan that she tried to put her in a dress which she ripped. After hearing from Brooke that the girl doesn't seem to like wearing clothes, Jonathan ends up donating his shirt and some other minor clothes to her with his scent on him followed by him starting her reeducation while brushing her long hair while Brooke looks into her past. With the help of some action figures he obtained following an attempt on her life, Jonathan ends up using the figures to reenact the boat accident. After this, Sarah splashed the water near the boat and broke down in tears. Stanford's men later infiltrate Jonathan's house and capture her while knocking her out. With the help of Tyrone and Brooke, Jonathan caught up to Stanford's boat where his men push a crate that Sarah was placed in into the ocean. In the form of a dolphin, Jonathan rescued Sarah as she swam to Brooke's boat while Stanford and his men are arrested by the approaching police. When in some new clothes, Sarah says her first words "Sarah, girl" as Jonathan, Brooke, and Tyrone prepare to reunite her with one of her relatives.
 A similar plotline written by Michael Berk and Douglas Schwartz (who also wrote the episode above) had occurred in The Wizard episode "Endangered Species." A similar accident in 1977 caused by Mr. Deshays (portrayed by Gerald Gordon) had happened to the parents of a younger Linda Winthrope, causing her to be raised by wolves and living in the Sultanpur district's forests naked, untamed, filthy, and acting less than human. When the wolf girl (portrayed by Priscilla Weems) is captured, she becomes a subject at the university where she is held and has been dressed in a leopard-skinned dress since she rips whatever clothes is offered to it. She ends up nearly killed by someone hired by Mr. Deshays and gains the trust of Simon McKay. Linda is saved from being drowned in the ocean and Mr. Deshays and his men are arrested by the coast guard. When in some new clothes, Linda says her first words "Linda, girl" as Simon prepares to reunite her with one of her relatives.
 In the Thunder in Paradise episode "Endangered Species," an ill-fated expedition had left a young Tommy Ralston (played by Alexander Sommer) orphaned and raised by wolves. Some years later, poachers have found Tommy Ralston (who now has long hair and longer fingernails) living with wolves while hunting and managed to catch him. He is freed by Randolph J. Spencer who makes it his mission to find out the boy's identity and find out who wants him dead.
 In the Star Wars animated spin-off series Ewoks Kneessa's older sister, Asha, was raised by wolf-like creatures korrinas, after being swiped down a river while escaping a hanadak, she was later found by Kneessa and her friend Wicket and returned with them to Bright Tree Village.

 In the She-Ra: Princess of Power episode "Wild Child," Princess Allegra (voiced by Linda Gary) is the daughter of the Green Island Kingdom's ruler King Arbor (voiced by George DiCenzo) who was presumed missing following a shipwreck at the age of 7. In truth, she was rescued by the White Fangs and lived with them in the Whispering Woods while sporting a feral dress. Even though she can speak the language of the White Fangs even when speaking with her "sister" Ayla, she still maintains her English language. 5 years later, she makes herself known to Adora, Bow, and Mermista when the local woodsmen have accused the White Fangs into causing all plants in the Whispering Woods to wither. She was taken to the Great Rebellion's camp to await her reunion with her father where she was freshened up by Perfuma and beat some children in a foot race. When Ayla was caught by the woodsmen, Allegra and She-Ra came to her defense until it was discovered that lava was flowing underneath the Whispering Woods. After She-Ra and Swift Wind extinguished the lava, Allega was reunited with her father and went home with him. She did speak to Ayla in White Fang language one more time that she'll be with their pack in spirit.
 In the DuckTales episode "Jungle Duck", Mrs. Beakley is reunited with a feral duck (voiced by Frank Welker) whom she worked as a nanny to at a young age. The character is effectively Tarzan re-imagined in the DuckTales world, and is even stated to be the heir to the royal house of "Greydrake" (a send-up of Tarzan's role as Lord of Greystoke).
 In the Star Trek: Deep Space Nine episode "Time's Orphan", an eight-year-old child of a couple in the crew of the ship falls through a time portal from which she emerges ten years older having experienced a decade in solitary existence. She was wild and uncontrollable, needing institutional care, so her parents returned her to the void she had become accustomed to, where she instead succeeded in preventing the incident (through a time-travel paradox).
 An episode of The Pretender titled" Wild Child" featured a young wild girl that was named Violet (portrayed by Lindsey Evanson). Jarod witnesses her being dragged away in a police car after being caught by hunters near their trailer. The wild girl was shown to be barefoot, had back-length hair, and was wearing some type of ripped dress. Upon being brought to the hospital, the wild girl tries to escape only to collide with a window. Jarod pretends to be a state appointed psychiatrist Dr. Jarod Bell to work with the girl (who had been cleaned up, put in some hospital clothes, and her hair had been cut to chin length) and to help her. He works with Dr. Bennett (portrayed by Michael Phenicie) and Dr. Wolverton (portrayed by Richard Doyle). Jarod gets a good contact with the found girl and named her Violet in the same time befriending with a female doctor in the staff named Dr. Anne Sulvane (portrayed by Françoise Robertson) who tended to Violet's ankle injury. The wild girl tries to communicate and gets a seizure as Jarod discovers it to be caused by a mix of 12 different viruses that the girl's doll was infected with. Jarod thinks that was made to prevent her from communicating and steals her from the hospital. Jarod searches the girl's "home" in the woods near a hot spring and discovers a photo depicting Violet as a baby with her parents, the girl leads Jarod and the female doctor to a plane crash site. Jarod discovers in the vicinity of the girls "home" a camera and research materials that include an article about a missing family of three with the surveillance tapes revealing that the observer is Dr. Wolverton where the final footage showed him freeing her foot from a bear trap which would explain the ankle wound she had when she was discovered. Jarod plots a payback to Dr. Wolverton. He shoots Dr. Wolverton with a tranquilizer dart. When he wakes up, he finds himself trapped in a cave. Jarod gets a confession and leaves Dr. Wolverton a doll to spend the night with. The next day, Dr. Wolverton is arrested for the abuse of Violet and Dr. Anne Sulvane becomes Violet's legal guardian as Violet is now seen in a dress. Jarod gives the girl a new doll and drives away.
 In The Wild Thornberrys, Donnie (voiced by Flea), the youngest in the family, spent most of his early years with orangutans. His history was revealed in the TV movie "The Origin of Donnie" where his human parents were killed by two poachers when saving some orangutans. Though the natives held a funeral for the two, Donnie was taken in by a bunch of orangutans living in the nude until he was discovered by the Thornberry family and sporting his trademark leopard-print shorts.
 The Sheena episode "The Feral King" featured Sheena's encounter with a teenage wild man named Jared Chambers (played by Rick Perkins). When Jared was eight, Jared's cousin Roland (played by Peter Penuel) and his partner Bixby (played by Ron Ely) end up rigging the plane carrying Jared, his father Raymond, and his unnamed mother where it crashed somewhere in the Torags region of Africa with Jared as the only survivor. 10 years later, Jared is sporting a loincloth, a pair of animal hide boots, and shoulder blade-length hair. Sheena and Max Cutter work with Jared's former babysitter Andrea (played by Justine Eyre) to keep Jared from being disposed of by Roland, Bixby, and their ally Lou (played by Robert Herrick) which ends with Sheena's Darak'na form killing Roland, Bixby, and Lou. Afterwards, Jared makes a fumbling attempt to say Andrea's name. After Andrea thanks Max Cutter and Sheena, she brings out Jared in civilized clothes and his hair is in ponytail at shoulder length. When Andrea states that she plans to bring Jared back to Africa someday, Sheena tells Jared that he'll always have a home in Africa and not to forget his wild life there.
 The Monarch from the Cartoon Network Adult Swim show The Venture Bros. was raised by monarch butterflies in his youth. He wears a monarch butterfly costume with a crown, showing his "royal" status.
 In Juken Sentai Gekiranger, a show in Toei Company's Super Sentai franchise, Kandou Jan/GekiRed was, as a young child, the sole survivor when his village was destroyed, and was raised in the nearby forest by tigers and pandas. Growing up in the company of animals has taught him to feel with his body rather than his heart, which is something he must re-learn. One of his notable idiosyncrasies is his personal 'Jan-ish' language, using onomatopoeia in place of many of the words he does not know.
 In The Mighty Boosh, the main character Vince Noir claims to have been raised in the forest by Bryan Ferry and various animals, whilst living in a tree house made out of bus tickets.
 The Pokémon episode "The Kangaskhan Kid" featured a boy named Tommy (voiced by Jimmy Zoppi in the English dub) who is raised by Pokémon called Kangaskhan in a reserve that is near the Safari Zone.
 In Digimon Data Squad (Digimon Savers in Japan), the character Keenan Crier (Ikuto Noguchi in Savers) was brought into the Digital World as an infant and raised by the Digimon Frigimon to believe that he is a Digimon. After Frigimon's death at the hands of one of Akihiro Kurata's Gizumon, Keenan was raised by Merukimon. When brought back to the human world around the age of eleven, he greatly protested being treated as a human and having to act as one, coming off as very wild, and (at least in Savers) spoke in a very stilted manner from his lack of communication with humans.
 In a Season 4 episode of Supernatural, two humans (portrayed by Mandy Playdon and Mark Wynn) are found in a house thought to be haunted. Instead, it is discovered the two children were the product of Bill Gibson (portrayed by Gerry Rousseau) impregnating his daughter Rebecca, mother of the children, who later committed suicide. The children, though never explicitly described as feral, lack the ability to speak, survive off rats, and are extremely violent. They were held captive in the walls and basement of their house, but broke free and killed their father, and started to terrorize the Carter family that moved there where they killed Uncle Ted. Eventually, the boy is shot dead in self-defense by Dean Winchester while the girl is stabbed to death by the father of the family after she goes after his wife and daughter where he pulled her away. They were described as likely having never seen the light of day and "barely human."
 In Deadman Wonderland, Gazuchi Mōzuri of the Undertakers was a wild man abandoned by his mother and raised by bears who was sent to Deadman Wonderland for the murder of several hunters and campers at age ten. The one camper he spared was the snake-like Shinagawa Dōkoku who assisted Gazuchi with his killing.
 In the China, IL episode "Prom Face/Off," Mark "Baby" Cakes finds a feral girl dressed in only a shirt and shorts in a condemned building where the staff-only prom was being held. Mark names her Maddie and plans to make her be his date. When Mark gets her cleaned up and she is seen only wearing a dress, his father Professor Leonard Cakes recognized her and learned where the prom is being held. It is soon discovered during the prom that she was part of a group of feral hippies that Professor Cakes had worked on in the condemned building as part of an anti-hippie experiment and faked their destruction. When the feral hippies attacked where they started ripping off people's parts, some of the people held their own against them until Professor Cakes arrived. After Professor Cakes had gotten the feral hippies back in line, he admitted to having faked their destruction and even had a secret affair with a female feral hippie named Haystack that was the mother of Maddie and some of the other feral hippies.
 The ABC series Once Upon a Time gives the Huntsman from Snow White a backstory of being raised by wolves.
 In the Total Drama episode "African Lying Safari", Ezekiel has completely devolved into a feral-state and stays feral for the rest of the series. His appearance also devolved into a disheveled, zombie-like appearance based on Gollum from The Lord of the Rings.
 In the Liv and Maddie episode "Howl-A-Rooney," the character Emmy "Fangs" Wulfert (portrayed by Laura Marano) is a teenage "wolf girl" who was raised by wolves ever since she wandered away from her camp when she was little. She penned a book about her experience and still has some of her wolf traits like rolling around in the dirt, marking her territory, traveling in a dog cage when being flown out to locations because it was cheaper to fly this way for Fangs, getting used to how new people smell, eating meat off the ground, and howling enough to cause every dog in the area to howl. Fangs' appearance has her with dirty skin, dirty and ripped clothes, dirty and messy hair, fake claws on her fingers, and is always barefoot. She is invited to Stevens Point by Liv Rooney in an effort to teach her how to act like a wolf in preparation for Liv's audition for the film adaption of Space Werewolves. She eventually helps Liv master her howling by competing for the role of Tristan Lycanth.
 In the animated series Phineas and Ferb, the character Dr. Heinz Doofenshmirtz claims to have been abandoned by his parents and raised by ocelots, among other "tragic backstories" that he has almost every episode. Because many of his backstories involve his human family, it can be presumed that his time with the ocelots was brief, if it happened at all.
 In the Cartoon Network Series Adventure Time, Finn the Human, was raised by magical dogs.
 In the Netflix animated series The Adventures of the Leafeans, one of the main characters, Prince Gwin, was raised by a troll called Ivan since infancy, though he's trying to learn the ways of men, he still maintains his English vocabulary, the same thing happened to Grimbeard the Ghastly's son, Darek, who was raised by dragons ever since he was abandoned as a baby because he was a runt.
 In the Netflix original series Kipo and the Age of Wonderbeasts, one of the main characters named Wolf was raised by wolves.
 In the Netflix original series DreamWorks Dragons: Rescue Riders, the twins Dak and Leyla have been raised by dragons.
 In the Netflix series Maya and the Three, Chimi (voiced by Stephanie Beatriz) was raised by jungle animals after being kicked out of The Junglelands.

In games
 In the popular fighting game Street Fighter the character named Blanka was raised by the animals in the Amazon rainforest. His skin turned green, and he received electrical powers by being exposed to electric eels.
 The story of the 1994 video game Final Fantasy VI includes a character named Gau, a 13-year-old boy who lives wild on a fictional savanna called the Veldt (or Wild West in Japan). Abandoned shortly after birth, Gau raises himself among the fauna of the plain, learning how to fight in the exact style of many different monsters. At the age of 13 he encounters travelers Sabin Rene Figaro and Cyan Garamonde, and chooses to travel with them after they feed him some dried meat. Gau is capable of rudimentary human language, but has no social skills. Gau is later taught elementary manners to prepare him for reintroduction to his father who abandoned him, only to find that the man has been completely insane since Gau was born.
 In Legend of Legaia, the character Noa was an orphan who had been raised by the Ra-Seru, Terra (テルマ, Teruma?)-- who, while raising Noa, attached itself to a female wolf. Due to living most of her life alone in Snowdrift Cave with Terra the wolf, Noa is childish and ignorant; the outside world is new to her. She wants to see the world and meet her parents, who call to her in her dreams. She uses claws or tonfa batons to fight, and her Ra-Seru, Terra, is a wind elemental. Later in the game, she discovers that she is the long-lost daughter of the King and Queen of Conkram.
 In the Warhammer 40,000 Universe, Lion El Jonson, the Primarch of the Dark Angels Space Marine Legion, was abandoned in the dark jungles of Caliban for much of his early life. He could only roar and scream in rage and frustration and it was at adolescence where he had his first human contact. He became rather civilized after being found by the Paladins of Caliban, but still possessed a terrible inner rage and many other traits he had acquired while within the jungles.
 Arietta The Wild from the game Tales of the Abyss is born to humans and raised by ligers from childhood before being found and taught human languages. Her past allows her to control monsters to aid her in battle. In the Japanese version of the game, she is shown having an irregular speech pattern.
 In Red Dead Redemption II, there is a feral man to be found, living naked and with wolves after being separated from his dad during a hunting trip. When discovering the cave, the wolves will attack you. If you manage to kill the wolves, the boy will hide in the cave crying and it will cost you some honor points.
 In Genshin Impact, there is a playable character named Razor who was raised by wolves. He is shown to have trouble speaking. He has lived with the wolves of Wolvendom for as far as he can remember, and considers them to be his family, or lupical.

Miscellaneous
 In Cave Club, the cavegirl Roaralei is revealed to be raised by Smilodons.

See also
 Feral child
 Infant exposure
 Mowgli Syndrome
 Psychogenic dwarfism

References

Further reading
 Mother was A Lovely Beast (subtitled 'A Feral Man Anthology Fiction and Fact About Humans Raised By Animals') edited by Philip José Farmer (1974)
 Biography of Geoff Bass - A Life History''

Lists of fictional children